For the athletics competitions at the 2012 Summer Olympics the following qualification systems were in place. The list has been updated to 30 June 2012. Qualification ended on 8 July 2012.

Qualifying standards
A National Olympic Committee (NOC) may enter up to 3 qualified athletes in each individual event if all athletes meet the A standard, or 1 athlete per event if they meet the B standard. An NOC may also enter a maximum of 1 qualified relay team per event. NOCs may enter athletes regardless of time (1 athlete per sex) if they have no athletes meeting the qualifying A or B standards. This makes it possible for every nation to have a minimum of two representatives in the sport.

The qualifying time standards may be obtained in various meets during the qualifying period that have the approval of the IAAF. All approved outdoor meets and indoor meets with the exception of 100 m, 200 m and 110/100 m hurdles races are eligible. The qualifying period for the 10,000 m, marathon, walks and combined events is from 1 January 2011 to 8 July 2012; for all other individual events it is 1 May 2011 to 8 July 2012. Relay qualification is between 1 January 2011 to 2 July 2012.

In addition to the qualifying standards below, marathon runners finishing in the top 20 of the 2011 World Championships or in the top 10 of any IAAF gold series marathon within the qualification period are also treated as having earned the A standard.

The NOCs were still allowed to select participants using their own rules, on the condition all athletes have made the qualifying time. For example, the United States selected athletes based on the result of the 2012 United States Olympic Trials event. Sweden only entered athletes good enough to reach at least 8th position, based on an assessment by the Swedish NOC.

The IAAF Qualifying Standards are as follows:

Men's events

Men's 100 m

Men's 200 m

Men's 400 m

Men's 800 m

Men's 1500 m

Men's 5000 m

Men's 10,000 m

Men's marathon

Men's 3000 m steeplechase

Men's 110 m hurdles

Men's 400 m hurdles

Men's high jump

Men's pole vault

Men's long jump

Men's triple jump

Men's shot put

Men's discus throw

Men's hammer throw

Men's javelin throw

Men's decathlon

Men's 20 km race walk

Men's 50 km race walk

Men's 4x100 m relay

Men's 4x400 m relay

Women's events

Women's 100 m

Women's 200 m

Women's 400 m

Women's 800 m

Women's 1500 m

Women's 5000 m

Women's 10,000 m

Women's marathon

Women's 3000 m steeplechase

Women's 100 m hurdles

Women's 400 m hurdles

Women's high jump

Women's pole vault

Women's long jump

Women's triple jump

Women's shot put

Women's discus throw

Women's hammer throw

Women's javelin throw

Women's heptathlon

Women's 20 km race walk

Women's 4x100 m relay

Women's 4x400 m relay

References

Qualification for the 2012 Summer Olympics
2012 in athletics (track and field)
Qualification